Kamaliya Bulatova (born 23 January 2003) is a Russian chess player who holds the FIDE title of Woman FIDE Master (WFM).

Biography
Kamaliya Bulatova was student of Tatarstan Chess School. In 2015, she won Zelenodolsk city men's chess championship. In 2016, Kamaliya Bulatova won Republic of Tatarstan Women's Chess Championship. In 2015, she ranked 2nd in Russian Youth Chess Championship in the U15 girls age group, but after year won this tournament.

Bulatova has repeatedly represented Russia at European Youth Chess Championships and World Youth Chess Championships. In 2012, in Iași she won silver medal in World School Chess Championship in the U08 girls age group. In 2018 August in Riga she won European Youth Chess Championship 2018 in the U16 girls age group.

FIDE ratings

References

External links
 
 
 

2003 births
Living people
Russian female chess players
Chess Woman FIDE Masters